Limnaecia perpusilla is a moth in the family Cosmopterigidae. It is found on Guadalcanal.

References

Natural History Museum Lepidoptera generic names catalog

Limnaecia
Moths described in 1961
Moths of the Solomon islands